The 2015 Panda Cup was the second edition of Panda Cup, an under-19 association football competition. The tournament was hosted in Chengdu between 24 and 28 June 2015. Players born on or after 1 January 1997 are eligible to compete in the tournament.

Participating teams

Venues

Standings

Matches
All times are China Standard Time (UTC+08:00)

Goalscorers
5 goals
 Koki Ogawa

4 goals
 Takeru Kishimoto

3 goals
 Yang Liyu

2 goals

 Kazunari Ichimi
 Adrián Kopičár

1 goal

 Yuto Iwasaki
 Itsuki Urata
 Aidar Mambetaliev
 Filip Balaj
 Denis Horník
 Tomáš Šalata

Own goals
  Azat Murzashev (against China PR)
  Danislam Zagidulin (against Slovakia)

References

2015 in association football
2015 in Chinese football
June 2015 sports events in China
International association football competitions hosted by China